Jacques Leonard Lemieux (born April 8, 1943) is a Canadian former professional ice hockey player who played for the Los Angeles Kings in the National Hockey League (NHL). He was selected in 15th round, 85th overall by the Kings in the 1967 NHL Expansion Draft. Lemieux was one of the players from the 1967 team that was honored before the Kings' first home game of the 2016–17 season.

References

External links
 

1943 births
Living people
Los Angeles Kings players
People from Matane
Canadian ice hockey defencemen